This is a list of coral islands on the atolls of Tokelau.

 Ahua
 Apia
 Avakilikili
 Awtano
 Fale
 Fatigauhu
 Fenua Fala
 Fenua Loa
 Lalo
 Laulauia
 Matangi
 Motu Akea
 Motufala
 Motuhaga
 Mulifenua
 Niututahi
 Nukulakia
 Nukumatau
 Punalei
 Saumagalu
 Saumatafanga
 Taulagapapa
 Te Fakanava
 Te Kamu
 Te Puka e Mua
 Te Puku
 Teafua
 Tokelau (atoll)

See also
 List of islets in Tokelau
 List of villages in Tokelau

 
Islands
Tokelau